KGST (1600 kHz) is a commercial AM radio station in Fresno, California, broadcasting an ethnic radio format.  It is owned by Lotus Communications with studios on East Olive Avenue in Fresno.  The station uses a brokered programming plan, with shows in English, Spanish, Portuguese and Armenian.  

KGST is powered at 5,000 watts.  By day, it is non-directional.  But at night, to avoid interfering with other stations on 1600 AM, it uses a directional antenna with a four-tower array.  The transmitter is off West Church Avenue in the Edison neighborhood of Fresno.

History

It started out as a mixed-format "international" station with programs available in Armenian, Italian, Japanese, Portuguese, Spanish, and Serbian. Its programs were hosted by brokers who paid for airtime.  

It later became one of the earliest radio stations in California and the first in the San Joaquin Valley with full-time Spanish-language programming. At its inception, KGST was the only independent (not affiliated with the four major networks) station in Fresno's five-station market (c.f. White's Radio Log, Fall 1949).

For most of the years it played Regional Mexican music, it was known as "La Mexicana."  Juan Mercado, who got his start as the Spanish-language programming director at a Visalia station, was one of the most popular deejays at the station. In 1959, he was able to buy the station due to his success. Mercado died just two years later and the station was bought by a couple of men who were at the time also running KLOK in San Jose.

In the mid-1950s to 1960s, KGST was a "eclectic" mix of C&W, Blues, Jazz, and Spanish and other language programming. "Happy Harold's House of Blues" was a program fixture for many years (c.f. Fresno Bee radio logs). In that time, KGST was a daytimer, running 1,000 watts and required to sign off at sunset.(c.f. White's Radio Log, various editions).  KGST later got a boost in power to 5,000 watts and full time authorization.

In 1988, KGST was bought by Lotus Corporation.  For a time, KGST was the Fresno network affiliate for ESPN Deportes, a Spanish-language sports service.

References

External links
 History of KGST "La Mexicana" 1600 AM (history thesis)
 National Park Service: Survey of Historic Sites important to Mexican-Americans in California

Mass media in Fresno, California
GST
Japanese-language radio stations
Radio stations established in 1949
GST
1949 establishments in California
Lotus Communications stations